Noun is one of the parts of speech.

Noun or Nouns may also refer to:
 Noun (department), a division of the West province in Cameroon 
 Noun River (Cameroon)
 Noun River (Morocco)
 Nouns (album), an album by No Age
Noun (band), the solo project of Screaming Females guitarist Marissa Paternoster
Noun (EP)
 Noun, instruction type for Apollo Guidance Computer (AGC)
 National Open University of Nigeria
 The Noun Project
 "Nouns", a song by They Might Be Giants from the album Nanobots